Pachystegia insignis is a species of flowering plants in the family Asteraceae. It is endemic to New Zealand.

References 

Astereae
Taxa named by Joseph Dalton Hooker
Taxa named by Thomas Frederic Cheeseman
Endemic flora of New Zealand